Ivan Stephan Sokolnikoff (1901,  Chernigov Province, Russian Empire – 16 April 1976, Santa Monica) was a Russian-American applied mathematician, who specialized in elasticity theory and wrote several mathematical textbooks for engineers and physicists.

Biography
Born to a wealthy family in Tsarist Russia, Ivan Sokolnikoff was educated by private tutors and at Anders Classical Gymnasium in Kiev. During the Russian Revolution, as a Tsarist naval officer, he was wounded in combat off the Kuril Islands. With the victory of the Reds, he became a refugee in China. There he worked for a subsidiary of an American electrical firm until 1922 when he became an American immigrant in Seattle. In 1922 he matriculated at the University of Idaho and graduated there with an electrical engineering degree in 1926. In 1930 he received his doctorate in mathematics from the University of Wisconsin-Madison. His doctoral dissertation On a Solution of Laplace's Equation with an Application to the Torsion Problem for a Polygon with Reentrant Angles was written under the supervision of Herman William March. In June 1931 Sokolnikoff married Elizabeth Thatcher Stafford. During the years from 1931 to 1941, they wrote 5 significant papers together, as well as the classic textbook Higher Mathematics for Physicists and Engineers. He joined the mathematics department of the University of Wisconsin–Madison as an instructor in 1927 and was promoted to full professor in 1941. At Wisconsin he was a member of the mathematics faculty until 1944.

During WW II Sokolnikoff lived in New York and Washington and did research on ship gun fire-control for the National Defense Research Council. While Sokolnikoff was on the East Coast, Elizabeth Stafford Sokolnikoff taught mathematics and remained in Madison, Wisconsin. Along with mathematical professors William LeRoy Hart (1892–1984) of the University of Minnesota and William Thomas Reid (1907–1977) of the University of Chicago, he organized a pre-meteorology program in which a number of academic institutions trained meteorologists for the U.S. armed forces. In 1946 he became a mathematics professor at the University of California at Los Angeles (UCLA). There he retired as professor emeritus in 1965. In 1947 he divorced his first wife and married Ruth Lawyer in December of that year.

Sokolnikoff was twice a visiting professor at Brown University. He was also twice a Guggenheim Fellow. His Guggenheim Fellowship for the academic year 1952-1953 was spent partly at the Royal Holloway College, London University and partly at the Free University of Brussels. His Guggenheim Fellowship for the academic year 1959–1960 was spent at the Swiss Federal Institute of Technology in Zürich. For the academic year 1962–1963 he held a Fulbright lecturing fellowship at Ankara's Middle East Technical University.

Upon his death he was survived by his widow and a daughter from his second marriage.

Selected publications

Articles

Books
 with Elizabeth Stafford Sokolnikoff:  Higher Mathematics for Engineers and Physicists , McGraw Hill, 1934, 2nd edition 1941
  Advanced Calculus , McGraw Hill 1939
  The Mathematical Theory of Elasticity , McGraw Hill, 1946, 2nd edition 1956
  Tensor Analysis - theory and applications to geometry and mechanics of continua , Wiley 1951, 2nd edition 1964
 with Raymond Redheffer: Mathematics of physics and modern engineering, McGraw Hill 1958, 2nd edition 1966

References

20th-century American mathematicians
20th-century Russian mathematicians
Applied mathematicians
Russian and Soviet emigrants to the United States
University of Idaho alumni
University of Wisconsin–Madison College of Letters and Science alumni
University of Wisconsin–Madison faculty
University of California, Los Angeles faculty
1901 births
1976 deaths